The 1958 Copa del Generalísimo was the 56th staging of the Spanish Cup. The competition began on 18 May 1958 and concluded on 29 June 1958 with the final.

Round of 16

|}
Tiebreaker

|}

Quarter-finals

|}

Semi-finals

|}

Final

|}

External links
 rsssf.com
 linguasport.com

1958
Copa del Rey
Copa